The Sea Vultures ( and also known as Predators of the Sea) is a 1916 Swedish silent drama film directed by Victor Sjöström. Filmed on the island of Landsort, the plot entails smuggling. The film starred Richard Lund, Greta Almroth, and John Ekman.

Cast
 Greta Almroth as Gabriele
 John Ekman as Birger
 Nils Elffors as Anton
 Richard Lund as Arnold
 Rasmus Rasmussen as Hornung
 Jenny Tschernichin-Larsson as Mrs. Arnold

References

External links

1916 films
1910s Swedish-language films
Swedish drama films
Swedish silent short films
Swedish black-and-white films
1916 drama films
1916 short films
Films directed by Victor Sjöström
Silent drama films